Ferschl is a German surname. Notable people with the surname include:

 Karl-Heinz Ferschl (born 1944), German football player
 Susanne Ferschl (born 1973), German politician

German-language surnames